The Mikoyan-Gurevich MiG-17 (NATO reporting name: Fresco) is a high-subsonic fighter aircraft produced in the Soviet Union from 1952 and was operated by air forces internationally. The MiG-17 was license-built in China as the Shenyang J-5 and Poland as the PZL-Mielec Lim-6. The MiG-17 is still being used by the North Korean air force in the present day and has seen combat in the Middle East and Asia.

The MiG-17 was an advanced modification of the MiG-15 aircraft produced by the Soviet Union during the Korean War. Production of the MiG-17 was too late for use in that conflict and was first used in the Second Taiwan Strait Crisis in 1958. While the MiG-17 was designed to shoot down slower American bombers, it showed surprising success when used by North Vietnamese pilots to combat American fighters and fighter-bombers during the Vietnam War, nearly a decade after its initial design. This was due to the MiG-17 being more agile and maneuverable than the American F-4 Phantom and F-105 Thunderchief, which were focused on speed and long range combat, as well as the fact that MiG-17 was armed with a gun, which initial models of the F-4 Phantom lacked.

Design and development
While the MiG-15bis introduced swept wings to air combat over Korea, the Mikoyan-Gurevich design bureau had already begun work on its replacement in 1949 (originally the MiG-15bis45) in order to fix any problems found with the MiG-15 in combat. The result was one of the most successful transonic fighters introduced before the advent of true supersonic types such as the Mikoyan-Gurevich MiG-19 and North American F-100 Super Sabre. The design would ultimately still prove effective into the 1960s when pressed into subsonic dogfights over Vietnam against much faster planes that were not optimized for maneuvering in such slower speed, short-range engagements.

While the MiG-15 used a Mach sensor to deploy airbrakes because it could not safely exceed Mach 0.92, the MiG-17 was designed to be controllable at higher Mach numbers. Early versions that retained the original Soviet copy of the Rolls-Royce Nene engine, the Klimov VK-1, were heavier with equal thrust. Later MiG-17s would be the first Soviet fighter application of an afterburner, which burned extra fuel in the exhaust of the basic engine to give extra thrust.

Though the MiG-17 looks very similar to the MiG-15, it had a new thinner and more highly swept wing and tailplane for speeds approaching Mach 1. While the F-86 introduced the "all-flying" tailplane, which made the aircraft more controllable near the speed of sound, this feature would not be adopted on MiG aircraft until the fully supersonic MiG-19. The wing sweep was 45° (like the U.S. F-100 Super Sabre) near the fuselage and 42° for the outboard part of the wing. The stiffer wing resisted the tendency to bend its wingtips and lose aerodynamic symmetry unexpectedly at high speeds and wing loads.

Other easily visible differences to its predecessor were the addition of a third wing fence on each wing, the addition of a ventral fin and a longer and less tapered rear fuselage that added about one meter in length. The MiG-17 shared the same Klimov VK-1 engine, and much of the rest of its construction such as the forward fuselage, landing gear and gun installation was carried over. The first prototype, designated I-330 "SI" by the construction bureau, was flown on the 14 January 1950, piloted by Ivan Ivashchenko.

In the midst of testing, pilot Ivan Ivashchenko was killed when his aircraft developed flutter, which tore off his horizontal tail, causing a spin and crash on 17 March 1950. Lack of wing stiffness also resulted in aileron reversal which was discovered and fixed. Construction and tests of additional prototypes "SI-2" and experimental series aircraft "SI-02" and "SI-01" in 1951, were generally successful. On 1 September 1951, the aircraft was accepted for production, and formally given its own MiG-17 designation after so many changes from the original MiG-15. It was estimated that with the same engine as the MiG-15's, the MiG-17's maximum speed is higher by 40–50 km/h, and the fighter has greater manoeuvrability at high altitude.

Serial production started in August 1951, but large quantity production was delayed in favor of producing more MiG-15s so it was never introduced in the Korean War. It did not enter service until October 1952, when the MiG-19 was almost ready to be flight tested. During production, the aircraft was improved and modified several times. The basic MiG-17 was a general-purpose day fighter, armed with three cannons, one Nudelman N-37 37 mm cannon and two 23 mm with 80 rounds per gun, 160 rounds total.  It could also act as a fighter-bomber, but its bombload was considered light relative to other aircraft of the time, and it usually carried additional fuel tanks instead of bombs.

Although a canopy which provided clear vision to the rear—necessary for dogfighting, like the F-86—was designed, production MiG-17Fs got a cheaper rear-view periscope, which would still appear on Soviet fighters as late as the MiG-23. By 1953, pilots got safer ejection seats with protective face curtains and leg restraints like the Martin-Baker seats in the West. The MiG-15 had suffered for its lack of a radar gunsight, but in 1951, Soviet engineers obtained a captured F-86 Sabre from Korea, and copied the optical gunsight and SRD-3 gun ranging radar to produce the ASP-4N gunsight and SRC-3 radar. The combination would prove deadly over the skies of Vietnam against aircraft such as the F-4 Phantom whose pilots lamented that guns and radar gunsights had been omitted as obsolescent.

The second prototype variant, "SP-2" (dubbed "Fresco A" by NATO), was an interceptor equipped with a radar. Soon a number of MiG-17P ("Fresco B") all-weather fighters were produced with the RP-1 Izumrud radar and front air intake modifications.

In early 1953 the MiG-17F day fighter entered production. The "F" indicated it was fitted with the VK-1F engine with an afterburner by modifying the rear fuselage with a new convergent-divergent nozzle and fuel system. Early VK-1F engines that were specifically modified to equip the MIG-17F had issues during prolongued normal afterburner usage, due to the insufficient heat resistance of the alloys used for the external nozzle body and stator vanes. Because of this, early 1953-1955 production planes had a special afterburner unit that used a separate tank filled with 90% ethanol for consumption in the afterburner due to its lower combustion temperature. This engine variant was labeled VK-1F(A). Later production jets used a normal system with on-board fuel. The afterburner doubled the rate of climb and greatly improved vertical maneuvers. But while the plane was not designed to be supersonic, skilled pilots could just dash to supersonic speed in a shallow dive, although the aircraft would often pitch up just short of Mach 1. This became the most popular variant of the MiG-17. The next mass-produced variant, MiG-17PF ("Fresco D") incorporated a more powerful Izumrud RP-2 radar, though they were still dependent on Ground Control Interception to find and be directed to targets. In 1956 a small series (47 aircraft) was converted to the MiG-17PM standard (also known as PFU) with four first-generation Kaliningrad K-5 (NATO reporting name AA-1 'Alkali') air-to-air missiles. A small series of MiG-17R reconnaissance aircraft were built with VK-1F engine (after first being tested with the VK-5F engine).

5,467 MiG-17, 1,685 MiG-17F, 225 MiG-17P and 668 MiG-17PF were built in the USSR by 1958. Over 2,600 were built under licence in Poland and China.

License production

In 1955, Poland received a license for MiG-17 production. The MiG-17F was produced by the WSK-Mielec factory under the designation Lim-5 (an abbreviation of licencyjny myśliwiec – licence-built fighter). The first Lim-5 was built on 28 November 1956 and 477 were built by 1960. Apart from Poland, a number were exported to Bulgaria, designated as MiG-17F.  An unknown number were built as the Lim-5R reconnaissance variant, fitted with the AFA-39 camera. In 1959–1960, 129 MiG-17PF interceptors were produced as the Lim-5P. WSK-Mielec also developed several Polish strike variants based on the MiG-17: the Lim-5M, produced from 1960; Lim-6bis, produced from 1963 (totalling 170 aircraft). Additionally some Lim-5Ps were converted in the 1970s into attack Lim-6Ms whereas other Lim-5, Lim-6bis and Lim-5P aircraft were modified for reconnaissance role as the Lim-6R,  Lim-6bis R and Lim-6MR.

In the People's Republic of China (PRC), an initial MiG-17F was assembled from parts in 1956, with license production following in 1957 at Shenyang. The Chinese-built version is known as the Shenyang J-5 (for local use) or F-5 (for export). Similarly the MiG-17PF was manufactured there as the J-5A (F-5A for export). Altogether 767 of these single-seater variants were built.

Operational history

MiG-17s were designed to intercept straight-and-level-flying enemy bombers, not for air-to-air combat (dogfighting) with other fighters. This subsonic (Mach .93) fighter was effective against slower (Mach .6-.8), heavily loaded U.S. fighter-bombers, as well as the mainstay American strategic bombers during the MiG-17's development cycle (such as the Boeing B-50 Superfortress or Convair B-36 Peacemaker, which were both still powered by piston engines). It was not however able to intercept the new generation of British jet bombers such as the Avro Vulcan and Handley Page Victor, which could both fly higher. The USAF's introduction of strategic bombers capable of supersonic dash speeds such as the Convair B-58 Hustler and General Dynamics FB-111 rendered the MiG-17 obsolete in front-line PVO service, and they were supplanted by supersonic interceptors such as the MiG-21 and MiG-23.

MiG-17s were not available for the Korean War, but saw combat for the first time over the Straits of Taiwan when the Communist PRC MiG-17s clashed with the Republic of China (ROC, Nationalist China) F-86 Sabres in 1958.

MiG-17s downed a reconnaissance aircraft in the 1958 C-130 shootdown incident over Armenia, with 17 casualties.

Vietnam War
In 1960, the first group of approximately 50 North Vietnamese airmen were transferred to the PRC to begin transitional training onto the MiG-17.  By this time the first detachment of Chinese trained MiG-15 pilots had returned to North Vietnam, and a group of 31 airmen were deployed to the Vietnam People's Air Force (VPAF) base at Son Dong for conversion to the MiG-17. By 1962 the first North Vietnamese pilots had finished their MiG-17 courses in the Soviet Union and the PRC, and returned to their units; to mark the occasion, the Soviets sent as a "gift" 36 MiG-17 fighters and MiG-15UTI trainers to Hanoi in February 1964.  These airmen would create North Vietnam's first jet fighter regiment, the 921st.  By 1965, another group of MiG pilots had returned from training in Krasnodar, in the USSR, as well as from the PRC.  This group would form North Vietnam's second fighter unit, the 923rd Fighter Regiment.  While the newly created 923rd FR operated only MiG-17s, and initially these were the only types available to oppose modern American supersonic jets before MiG-21s and MiG-19s were introduced into North Vietnamese service (the 925 FR regiment was formed in 1969, flying MiG-19s).

American fighter-bombers had been in theatre flying combat sorties since 1961, and the U.S. had many experienced pilots from the Korean War and World War II, such as World War II veteran Robin Olds. Untried MiGs and pilots of the VPAF would be pitted against some of the most combat experienced airmen of the U.S. Air Force (USAF) and U.S. Navy. On 3 April 1965 six MiGs took off from Noi Bai Air Base in two groups of two and four respectively, with the first acting as bait and the second being the shooters. Their target were U.S. Navy aircraft supporting an USAF 80-aircraft strike package trying to knock out the Thanh Hóa Bridge. Spence Thomas, who managed to land the aircraft at Da Nang Air Base. A second F-8 was claimed by his wingman Phan Van Tuc, but this is not corroborated by USN loss listings.

On 4 April 1965, the USAF made another attempt on the Thanh Hóa Bridge with 48 Republic F-105 Thunderchiefs of the 355th Tactical Fighter Wing (TFW) loaded with 384 x  bombs. The Thunderchiefs were escorted by a MIGCAP flight of F-100 Super Sabres from the 416th Tactical Fighter Squadron (416th TFS). Coming from above, four MiG-17s from the 921st Fighter Regiment bypassed the escorts and dove onto the Thunderchiefs, shooting two of them down; the leader Tran Hanh downed F-105D BuNo. 59-1754 of Major F. E. Benett, and his element leader Le Minh Huan downed F-105D BuNo. 59-1764 of Captain J. A. Magnusson.  The Super Sabres engaged; one AIM-9 Sidewinder was fired and missed (or malfunctioned), and another F-100D flown by Captain Donald Kilgus fired 20 mm cannons, scoring a probable kill. Tran Hanh's wingman Pham Giay went down and was killed. No other U.S. airmen reported any confirmed aerial kills during the air battle; Tran Hanh stated that three of his accompanying MiG-17s had been shot down by the opposing USAF fighters.

Three F-100s from the MiGCAP, piloted by LtCol Emmett L. Hays, Capt Keith B. Connolly, and Capt Donald W. Kilgus, all from the 416th TFS, had engaged the MiG-17s. The four attacking MiGs from the 921st FR were flown by Flight Leader Tran Hanh, Wingman Pham Giay, Le Minh Huan and Tran Nguyen Nam. Flight Leader Tran Hanh was the only Vietnamese survivor from the air battle and believed that the others in his flight were "... shot down by the F-105s." Based upon the report, the USAF F-100s could have been mistaken for F-105s, and the loss of three MiG-17s was attributed to Super Sabres, the first aerial victories of any American aircraft in the war. The F-100s themselves would never again encounter MiGs, being relegated to close air support. They were replaced in the MiGCAP role by faster and longer range but less manoeuvrable McDonnell Douglas F-4 Phantoms.

USAF Chief of Staff General John P. McConnell was "hopping mad" to hear that two Mach-2-class F-105s had been shot down by Korean War-era subsonic North Vietnamese MiG-17s.

In 1965, the NVAF had only 36 MiG-17s and a similar number of qualified pilots, which increased to 180 MiGs and 72 pilots by 1968. The Americans had at least 200 USAF F-4s and 140 USAF F-105s, plus at least 100 U.S Navy aircraft (F-8s, A-4s and F-4s) which operated from the aircraft carriers in the Gulf of Tonkin, plus scores of other support aircraft. The Americans had a multiple numerical advantage.

The MiG-17 was the primary interceptor of the fledgling VPAF in 1965, responsible for their first aerial victories and seeing extensive service during the Vietnam War. Some North Vietnamese pilots preferred the MiG-17 over the MiG-21 because it was more agile, though not as fast; three of the 16 VPAF Aces of the war (credited with shooting down five or more opposing aircraft) were from MiG-17s. Those were: Nguyen Van Bay (seven victories), Luu Huy Chao and Le Hai (both with six). The rest gained ace status in MiG-21s.

MiG-17/J-5 aerial combat victories in the Vietnam War 1965–1972
This table lists VPAF and Chinese air-to-air kills. Sources include Hobson p. 271 and Toperczer (#25) pp. 88–90.

VPAF flew their interceptors with guidance from ground controllers, who directed the MiGs to ambush American formations. The MIGs made fast attacks against US formations from several directions (usually the MiG-17s performed head-on attacks and the MiG-21s attacked from the rear). After shooting down a few American planes and forcing some of the F-105s to drop their bombs prematurely, the MiGs did not wait for retaliation, but disengaged rapidly. This "guerrilla warfare in the air" proved very successful

The MiG-17 was not originally designed to function as a fighter-bomber, but in 1971 Hanoi directed that United States Navy warships were to be attacked by elements of the VPAF. This would require the MiG-17 to be fitted with bomb mountings and release mechanisms. Chief Engineer of the VPAF ground crews, Truong Khanh Chau, was tasked with the mission of modifying two MiG-17s for the ground attack role; after three months of work, the two jets were ready.  On 19 April 1972, two pilots from the 923rd FR took their bomb laden MiG-17s and attacked the U.S. Navy destroyer  and light cruiser . Each MiG was armed with two  bombs. Pilot Le Xuan Di managed to hit the destroyer's aft 5" (127 mm) gun mount, destroying it, but inflicting no fatalities, as the crewmen had vacated the turret earlier due to a malfunction with the gun system.

From 1965 to 1972, MiG-17s from the VPAF 921st and 923rd FRs would claim 71 aerial victories against U.S. aircraft: 11 Crusaders, 16 F-105 Thunderchiefs, 32 F-4 Phantom IIs, two A-4 Skyhawks, seven A-1 Skyraiders, one C-47 cargo/transport aircraft, one Sikorsky CH-3C helicopter and one Ryan Firebee UAV., while VPAF lost 63 MiG-17s in air combat According to Russian sources, from 1965 to 1972, MiG-17s from the VPAF shot-down 143 enemy aircraft and helicopters, while VPAF lost 75 MiG-17s through all causes and 49 pilots were dead

The American fighter community was shocked in 1965 when elderly, subsonic MiG-17s downed sophisticated Mach-2-class F-105 Thunderchief fighter-bombers over North Vietnam. As a result of these experiences the U.S. Air Force initiated project "Feather Duster" aimed at developing tactics that would enable the heavier American fighters to deal with smaller and more agile opponents like the MiG-17. To simulate the MiG-17 the U.S. Air Force chose the F-86H Sabre. One pilot who participated in the project remarked that "In any envelope except nose down and full throttle", either the F-100 or F-105 was inferior to the F-86H in a dogfight. The project was generally successful in that the resulting tactics effectively minimised the disadvantages of the F-105, F-100 and other heavy American fighters while minimising the advantages of slower but more manoeuvrable fighters such as the F-86 and the MiG-17.

Other MiG-17 users 

Twenty countries flew MiG-17s. The MiG-17 became a standard fighter in all Warsaw Pact countries in the late 1950s and early 1960s. They were also bought by many other countries, mainly in Africa and Asia, that were neutrally aligned or allied with the USSR. The MiG-17 still flies today in the air forces of Democratic Republic of the Congo, Guinea, Mali, Madagascar, Sudan, and Tanzania, and by extension through the Shenyang J-5, North Korea. JJ-5s trainers are still in limited use in China as well.

Middle East
The Egyptian Air Force received its first MiG-17s in 1956, deploying them against the Israeli invasion of the Sinai during the early stages of the Suez Crisis. When Britain and France launched air attacks against Egyptian air bases on 1 November 1956, Egyptian president Gamal Abdel Nasser ordered the Egyptian Air Force not to oppose the Anglo-French air strikes, and where possible to evacuate its aircraft to Syria or Saudi Arabia, so while Egypt lost large numbers of aircraft, including MiG-17s, losses of pilots were relatively low. The losses were quickly replaced after the end of the war, and by June 1957 Egypt had about 100 MiG-17s. Syria also operated the MiG-17, receiving 60 MiG-17Fs in 1957. The two air forces gradually switched the MiG-17 to ground-attack duties in the early 1960s, as the MiG-21 supplemented it in the interceptor role. From 1962, Egyptian forces became involved in the North Yemen Civil War, supporting the republican government, with Egyptian MiG-17s flying ground attack operations.

The MiG-17 formed a major part of the Arab air strength during the Six-Day War in June 1967. The war started with a massive airstrike by Israel against Egyptian, Jordanian, Syrian and Iraqi airbases, with more than 150 Egyptian aircraft destroyed or damaged. Egypt's surviving MiG-17s were heavily deployed in ground attacks against Israeli forces in the Sinai. The Soviet Union again replaced Egypt's losses after the war, and Egypt was soon involved in the War of Attrition, a sustained series of armed clashes on and over Sinai, with Egypt's MiG-17s continuing to be used in the ground attack role. While the MiG-17 was slower and shorter-ranged than the Sukhoi Su-7 that was the other main component of Egypt's ground-attack forces, the MiG-17 was more manoeuvrable and sustained lower losses. From 1970, Egypt deployed detachments of MiG-17s to Sudan to support government forces during the First Sudanese Civil War. The MiG-17 continued in use in the Yom Kippur War. Mig-17s were used during the Ofira Air Battle by Egypt. Egyptian and Syrian Mig-17s retired shortly after these wars.

Africa
At least 24 of them served with the Nigerian Air Force and were flown by a mixed group of Nigerian and mercenary pilots from East Germany, Soviet Union, South Africa, the United Kingdom, and Australia during the 1967–70 Nigerian Civil War.

Asia
Four were hurriedly supplied by the USSR to Sri Lanka during the 1971 insurgency and were used for bombing and ground attack in the brief insurgency.

Soviet Union
In 1958, a US Air Force Lockheed C-130 was shot down by four MiG-17 fighters when it flew into Soviet airspace near Yerevan, Armenia while on a Sun Valley Signal intelligence mission, with all 17 crew killed.

United States

A number of U.S. federal agencies undertook a program at Groom Lake to evaluate the MiG-17 to help fight the Vietnam War, as the kill ratio against North Vietnamese MiG-17s and MiG-21s was only 2:1. The program was code-named HAVE DRILL (see also Have Doughnut), involving trials of two ex-Syrian MiG-17F Frescos, acquired and provided by Israel, over the skies of Groom Lake. These aircraft were given USAF designations and fake serial numbers so that they may be identified in DOD standard flight logs.

In addition to tracking the dog fights staged between the various MiG models against virtually every fighter in U.S. service, and against SAC's B-52 Stratofortresses and B-58 Hustlers to test the ability of the bombers’ countermeasures systems, they also performed radar cross-section and propulsion tests that contributed greatly to improvements in U.S. aerial performance in Vietnam.

According to the Federal Aviation Administration, there are 17 privately owned MiG-17s in the US. Several MiG-17s have been seized due to questions over the legality of their import into the country.

Variants

I-330
Prototype.
MiG-17 ("Fresco A")
Basic fighter version powered by VK-1 engine ("aircraft SI").
MiG-17A
Fighter version powered by VK-1A engine with longer lifespan.
MiG-17AS
Multirole conversion, fitted to carry unguided rockets and the K-13 air-to-air missile.
MiG-17P ("Fresco B")
All-weather fighter version equipped with Izumrud radar ("aircraft SP"). 225 built.
MiG-17F ("Fresco C")
Basic fighter version powered by VK-1F engine with afterburner ("aircraft SF"). 1,685 built.
MiG-17PF ("Fresco D")
All-weather fighter version equipped with Izumrud radar, 3 x 23 mm NR-23 cannons and VK-1F engine ("aircraft SP-7F"). 668 built.
MiG-17PM/PFU ("Fresco E")
Fighter version equipped with radar and K-5 (NATO: AA-1 "Alkali") air-to-air missiles ("aircraft SP-9").
MiG-17R
Reconnaissance aircraft with VK-1F engine and camera ("aircraft SR-2s")
MiG-17SN
Experimental variant with twin side intakes, no central intake, and nose redesigned to allow 23mm cannons to pivot to engage ground targets. Not produced.
M-17
Target UAV, converting program for Mig-17 with service life at it's end (1968).
PZL-Mielec Lim-5
Polish variant of MiG-17
S-104
Czechoslovak variant of MiG-17
Shenyang J-5
Chinese variant of MiG-17

Some withdrawn aircraft were converted to remotely controlled targets.

Operators

Current operators

 North Korean Air Force – 106 Shenyang F-5s and 135 Shenyang FT-5s are in service. However, reports of dire levels of serviceability suggest an airworthiness rate of less than 50%.

Former operators
Afghanistan
 Afghan Air Force received its first MiG-17s in 1957, and operated at least 50 in 1979. Remained in service in 1982.

 Albanian Air Force – operated both Soviet-built MiG-17 and Chinese-built F-5s.

 Algerian Air Force – operated 60 MiG-17Fs from the 1960s. Some remained in service as trainers in the late 1980s.

 Angolan Air Force

 Bulgarian Air Force – operated MiG-17Fs, 17-PFs and 17-Rs.

 Burkina Faso Air Force

 Royal Cambodian Air Force – 16 aircraft, including five MiG-17s and 11 Shenyang J-5s were received from the Soviet Union and China in 1967–1968, later all were destroyed on the ground in 1971.

 Khmer Air Force
 Democratic Kampuchea
 Kampuchean Revolutionary Army

 People's Liberation Army Air Force
 People's Liberation Army Naval Air Force

 Congolese Air Force

 Cuban Revolutionary Air and Air Defense Force

 Czechoslovak Air Force

 Air Forces of the National People's Army

 Egyptian Air Force

 Ethiopian Air Force

 Guinea Air Force

 Guinea-Bissau Air Force – In storage since 1991, aircraft thought to be inoperational.

 Hungarian Air Force

 Indonesian Air Force

 Iraqi Air Force

 Malagasy Air Force – 4 delivered in 1975 from North Korea.

Malian Air Force

Mongolian People's Army Air Force

 Royal Moroccan Air Force

 Mozambique Air Force

 Nigerian Air Force

 Yemen Arab Republic Air Force – 13 MiG-17s donated by the USSR in November 1967.

 Polish Air Force
 Polish Navy

 Romanian Air Force

 Somali Aeronautical Corps – In 1967, 30 MiG-17 and MiG-17F were delivered by the Soviet Union. In 1991 the Air Force was dissolved.

 People's Democratic Republic of Yemen Air Force – First ten MiG-17Fs delivered from the USSR in January 1969. Eight additional aircraft were delivered in 1971.

 Soviet Air Forces
 Soviet Air Defense Forces
 Soviet Naval Aviation

 Sri Lanka Air Force removed out of service after the 1971 Communist JVP Insurrection. Now preserved in SLAF Ratmalana museum.

 Syrian Air Force

 Ugandan Air Force – Some ex-Czech; serviceability doubtful.

 Formerly used for evaluation in the United States Air Force, however in January 2014 a camouflaged example was seen operating near Edwards AFB, possibly as a training vehicle at the USAF Test Pilot School where MiG-15s are routinely operated.

 Vietnam People's Air Force

Specifications (MiG-17F)

See also

References

Bibliography
 Anderton, David A. North American F-100 Super Sabre. Oxford, UK: Osprey Publishing Limited, 1987. .
 Belyakov, R.A. and J. Marmain. MiG: Fifty Years of Secret Aircraft Design. Shrewsbury, UK: Airlife Publishing, 1994. .
 Butowski, Piotr (with Jay Miller). OKB MiG: A History of the Design Bureau and its Aircraft. Leicester, UK: Midland Counties Publications, 1991. .
 Conboy, Kenneth. The War in Cambodia 1970-75(Men-at-Arms series 209). Oxford, UK: Osprey Publishing Ltd, 1989. .
 
 Crosby, Francis. Fighter Aircraft. London: Lorenz Books, 2002. .
 Davies, Peter E. North American F-100 Super Sabre. Ramsbury, Wiltshire, UK: The Crowood Press, 2003.  .
 Gordon, Yefim. Mikoyan-Gurevich MiG-17: The Soviet Union's Jet Fighter of the Fifties. Hinckley, UK: Midland Publishing, 2002. .
 Gunston, Bill. The Osprey Encyclopedia of Russian Aircraft 1875–1995. London: Osprey, 1995. .
 Hobson, Chris. Vietnam Air Losses, United States Air Force, Navy and Marine Corps Fixed-Wing Aircraft Losses in Southeast Asia 1961-1973. Midland Publishing (2001) England.  .
 Koenig, William and Peter Scofield. Soviet Military Power. Greenwich, Connecticut: Bison Books, 1983. .
 Michel III, Marshall L. Clashes: Air Combat Over North Vietnam 1965-1972. Annapolis, Maryland, USA: Naval Institute Press, 2007, First edition 1997. .
 Nicolle, David. "Bearing the Brunt: Thirty Years if MiG-17 Service with the Egyptian and Syrian Air Forces". Air Enthusiast, November–December 1995, No. 60. pp. 12–27. .
 Olynyk, Dr. Frank. US Post World War 2 Victory Credits. Self-published, 1999.
 Olds, Christina and Rasimus, Ed. Fighter Pilot; Robin Olds, Memoirs of Legendary Ace Robin Olds. 2010, St. Martin's Griffin, New York.  .

 Robinson, Anthony. Soviet Air Power. London: Bison Books, 1985. .
 Sweetman, Bill. Modern Fighting Aircraft: Volume 9: MiGs. New York: Arco Publishing, 1984. .
 Sweetman, Bill and Bill Gunston. Soviet Air Power: An Illustrated Encyclopedia of the Warsaw Pact Air Forces Today. London: Salamander Books, 1978. .
 Toperczer, István. MiG-17 And MiG-19 Units of the Vietnam War (Osprey Combat Aircraft #25). Oxford, UK: Osprey Publishing Limited, 2001. .
 Wilson, Stewart. Combat Aircraft since 1945. Fyshwick, Australia: Aerospace Publications, 2000. .

External links

 MiG-17 FRESCO from Global Security.org
 MiG-17 Fresco from Global Aircraft
 MiG-17 Fresco from Danshistory.com
 Cuban MiG-17
 MiG 17: Home of a True Fighter
 Warbird Alley's MiG-17 Page
 Mig Alley USA, Aviation Classics, Ltd Reno, NV
 Lethal Snakes - Russian viewpoint Mig-17 tactics 
 Blueprints 3-view

MiG-017
1950s Soviet fighter aircraft
Single-engined jet aircraft
Mid-wing aircraft
Aircraft first flown in 1950